Lotte Smiseth Sejersted (born 5 March 1991) is a former Norwegian alpine skier.

She won a silver medal at the 2009 Junior World Alpine Skiing Championships in Garmisch-Partenkirchen, in the downhill event. She took another two medals at the 2010 World Junior Championships: a silver in the combined and a bronze in the downhill. In 2011, she won gold in the downhill at the Junior World Alpine Skiing Championships in Crans Montana.

She made her World Cup debut in October 2009 in Sölden, but was disqualified. The same happened in two races in Åre in mid-December 2009, before she collected her first World Cup points with a 28th place in the super combined event in Val-d'Isère. She competed at the 2011 and 2013 Alpine Skiing World Championships. At the 2011 World Alpine Skiing Championships in Garmisch-Partenkirchen, Smiseth Sejersted set the fastest time in the second downhill training but during the main event she lost one ski and couldn't finish the course. However she also secured her best senior World Championship result that year, finishing tenth in the combined competition. At the 2014 Winter Olympics in Sochi, Russia, she finished sixth in the downhill. Her best results in the FIS Alpine Ski World Cup were a pair of fifth places which were obtained in downhills in Lenzerheide in March 2011 and Val-d'Isère in December 2013. She took a total of 16 national titles between 2007 and 2014, including five in downhill, four in Super-G, four in combined, two in giant slalom and one in slalom: in 2011 she won all five titles in the same year.

In January 2016 Smiseth Sejersted crashed in a World Cup downhill race in Zauchensee, suffering ligament injuries which ruled her out for the rest of the season. Subsequently in April 2017 she announced her retirement from competition.

She represented the sports club Stabæk IF, and hails from Hosle. She is the older sister of Adrian Smiseth Sejersted. She attended the Norwegian College of Elite Sport.

References

External links
 
 
 

1991 births
Living people
Sportspeople from Bærum
Norwegian female alpine skiers
Alpine skiers at the 2014 Winter Olympics
Olympic alpine skiers of Norway